A bishōnen is an ideally beautiful young man often seen in anime and manga

Bishōnen may also refer to:

 Bishonen (film), a film about homosexual love
 Bishonen (song), a song by Momus (artist)
 Bishonen Yonfan, a director
 Bishōnen (series), a novel series